The New Zealand Oath of Allegiance is defined by the Oaths and Declarations Act 1957. All Oaths can be taken in either Māori or English form.  It is possible to take an affirmation, which has the same legal effect as an Oath.

Oath

The Oath, in its present form, is:

In Māori, this is:

A modified version, with the added phrase "and I will obey the laws of New Zealand and fulfil my duties as a New Zealand citizen" is used as New Zealand's Oath of Citizenship.

Affirmation
An affirmation begins with "I, [name], solemnly, sincerely, and truly declare and affirm", and continues with the words of the oath prescribed by law, omitting any reference to God.

Other New Zealand Oaths
The chief justice administers the following oaths of office at the swearing-in of various government officials.  For simplification, the oaths set out below take the form they would have if used today in English.

Governor-General's Oath

Executive Council Oath

House of Representatives Oath

The Constitution Act 1986 requires that, before being permitted to sit or vote in the House of Representatives, members of Parliament must take the Oath of Allegiance.

Parliamentary Under-Secretaries Oath

Judicial Oath

Armed forces Oath

Police Oath

Alteration and augmentation of oaths
In May 2004, the Minister of Justice, Phil Goff, announced a review of New Zealand's oaths and affirmations stating that "This review also offers a chance for people to express a view on whether our oaths accurately reflect the values and beliefs that are important to New Zealanders in the 21st century". The Ministry of Justice reported in a discussion paper on oaths and affirmations that many were either out of date (such as the teachers' oath or the Queen's Counsel oath) or used arcane language. The review suggested that New Zealand could follow the experience of Australia by removing references to the Queen from the oaths. The Monarchist League called the change "republicanism by stealth" and commented that "[a] declaration of allegiance to New Zealand, or to the Prime Minister, would be a poor substitute [for the Queen]".

In response, the Republican Movement argued that removing references to the Queen was not "republicanism by stealth" but simply reflected the contemporary values of New Zealanders.
The Republican Movement also submitted that "[t]he Australians have already updated their oath of citizenship so that there is no mention of the Queen, while maintaining the exact same constitutional monarchy as New Zealand".

To this day the oath remains, with relevant personnel (e.g. military) swearing allegiance to the Queen, either in a traditional oath or a non-religious affirmation.

Oaths Modernisation Bill
One year after the review was announced, Phil Goff released the new forms the oaths were to take. The references to the Queen were retained, and the Oaths Modernisation Bill was introduced in Parliament.

The Bill would have made the following changes:
 It amends the parliamentary oath to include loyalty to New Zealand and respect for the democratic values of New Zealand and respect for the rights and freedoms of its people;
 It amends the citizenship oath to include loyalty to New Zealand, and respect for the democratic values of New Zealand and respect for the rights and freedoms of its people;
 It provides a Māori version of each oath. The Act provides that using a Māori equivalent of any of the oaths set out in that Act shall have full legal effect; 
 It amends the Act to prescribe a Māori language version of the words with which an affirmation must begin.

The Monarchist League was pleased with this outcome, stating, "While it may be questioned what 'loyalty to New Zealand', and 'respect for its democratic values' actually mean, it is heartening that no attempt was made to remove the oath of allegiance to the Queen." The Republican Movement stated that "[t]he best thing about the new oaths is that they can easily be changed when we become a republic".

After passing the first reading and going to the Government Administration Committee, the Bill had its second reading discharged on 1 June 2010, meaning it will not proceed.

Hone Harawira amendment 
In 2007, then Māori Party MP Hone Harawira put up an amendment (in the form of a supplementary order paper) to the Oaths Modernisation Bill inserting references to the oaths and affirmations to "uphold the Treaty of Waitangi".

Harawira eventually split from the Māori Party and resigned from parliament to re-contest his seat as leader of the Mana Party. He won the subsequent by-election. On 14 July 2011, Harawira was removed from the chamber by the Speaker of the House, Lockwood Smith, for not pledging the oath of allegiance as required by law.

See also
 Republicanism in New Zealand
 Oath of Allegiance
 Oath of Allegiance (United Kingdom)
 Oath of Allegiance (Australia)
 Oath of Allegiance (Canada)

References

External links
Oaths and Declarations Act 1957
Oaths Modernisation Bill

New Zealand
Government of New Zealand
Monarchy in New Zealand